Leucopogon fasciculatus, the tall mingimingi, is a species of shrub within the family Ericaceae. It is endemic to New Zealand.  This species is found in the North Island north of the Bay of Plenty and Taranaki. In the South Island it is found in north west Nelson. It is present in the red and silver beech forests admixed with rimu and miro podocarps on northern South Island.

Leucopogon fasciculatus is the host plant for the New Zealand endemic moth species Pyrgotis pyramidias .

References

fasciculatus
Endemic flora of New Zealand
Plants described in 1832